Blushing bride may refer to:

Our Blushing Brides, a 1930 film 
Serruria florida (blushing bride), a species of flowering plant native to South Africa
Tillandsia ionantha (Blushing Bride), a species of flowering plant in genus Tillandsia, a member of the Bromeliad family (Bromeliaceae).